Garage Mahal is the second album by Australian rock band Taxiride. As with Imaginate, Taxiride's debut album, it was recorded in Ocean Way Studios in Los Angeles and produced by Jack Joseph Puig. It contained Taxiride's most successful song, "Creepin' Up Slowly", which reached No. 6 in Australia. Garage Mahal went platinum.

Track listing
 "Afterglow" – 4:07
 "How I Got This Way" – 3:30
 "Creepin' Up Slowly" – 3:57
 "Forest for the Trees" – 3:47
 "Afraid to Fly" – 3:36
 "Saffron" – 3:15
 "This Time" – 3:23
 "Enemy" – 3:44
 "Skin" – 3:21
 "Happiness Without You" – 4:11
 "Stronger" – 3:51
 "Wait" – 4:35
 "Madrigal" – 1:48

Japanese bonus tracks
 "World's Away" – 2:58 
 "Happy" – 2:43

Charts

Weekly charts

Year-end charts

Certification

Release history

References

External links
 Taxiride Official Site
 MySpace Page

2002 albums
Taxiride albums